The slender worm lizard (Amphisbaena gracilis) is a worm lizard species in the family Amphisbaenidae. It is endemic to Venezuela.

References

Amphisbaena (lizard)
Reptiles described in 1881
Taxa named by Alexander Strauch
Endemic fauna of Venezuela
Reptiles of Venezuela